Mambattiyan is a 2011 Indian Tamil-language vigilante film co-written, produced and directed by Thiagarajan, starring his son Prashanth as the title character. The film, also starring Meera Jasmine, Prakash Raj, Vadivelu and Mumaith Khan in other pivotal roles, is a remake of the 1983 Tamil blockbuster Malaiyoor Mambattiyan that starred Thiagarajan himself and Saritha.The film got grand opening because of all songs were chartbusters until the film released on 16 December 2011 to average reviews from critics.

Plot 
IG Ranjith (Prakash Raj) recalls the memories of a criminal whom he failed to capture.

Annachchi (Kota Srinivasa Rao) rules a village in western Tamil Nadu. When he is opposed by Mambattiyan's (Prashanth) father Chinnasamy (Vijayakumar), the "jameen" kills him. Coming to know of this, Mambattiyan kills Annachi and those in support of him. A group of youngsters in the village join hands with Mambattiyan. They lead a life in a forest. By robbing the rich and distributing the wealth to the poor, Mambattiyan becomes the local Robin Hood.

Meanwhile, police forces led by Ranjith go from pillar to post to nab Mambattiyan. This is the start of a cat-and-mouse game between the two. Also, Mambattiyan has romance in the form of Kannathal (Meera Jasmine) and Sornam (Mumaith Khan). When Sornam raises a green flag, that means she needs him to come. An officer in disguises realizes this and reports it to Ranjith, so one by one, all of his gang members die. Sornam later commits suicide.

Meanwhile, Kannathal panicked and asked Mambattiyan to go to a faraway place and forgo his Robin Hood job. Mambattiyan agrees and asks her to wait at the river. With the help of Bullet (Ravi Shanth), a villager, Kannathal waits at the river. Mambattiyan defeats the police forces and escapes. However, Bullet shoots Mambattiyan because whoever captures Mambattiyan gets a rewards of money and land. Kannathal hits Bullet, and he dies, then she dies too.

At the end, Ranjith is sad that the whole village is crying, and he takes Mambattiyan's chain.

Cast 

 Prashanth as Mambattiyan
 Meera Jasmine as Kannathal
 Mumaith Khan as Sornam
 Prakash Raj as IG Ranjith
 Vadivelu as Silk Singaram
 Vijayakumar as Chinnasamy, Mambattiyan's father
 Kota Srinivasa Rao as Annachchi
 Manobala as Sundaralingam's accountant
 Rama as Thangam, Mambattiyan's mother
 Riyaz Khan as Fake Mambattiyan
 Kalairani as Village Doctor
 Ganeshkar as Driver
 Ravi Shanth as Bullet
 Hemalatha as Kanmani
 Aravinth as Oomaiyan
 Vengal Rao as Singaram's sidekick
 Vijay Ganesh as Singaram's sidekick
 Chelladurai as Singaram's sidekick
 G. A. Jagadeesan as Singaram's sidekick
 Shanti Priya
 Raaghav in a special appearance

Production 
It was first reported in September 2008, that Thiagarajan would remake Rajasekhar's 1983 film Malaiyoor Mambattiyan, with his son Prashanth portraying the lead role of a Robin Hood-esque figure. Meera Jasmine, Prakash Raj and Mumaith Khan were assigned roles shortly after, while the team also held talks with Kalabhavan Mani unsuccessfully for another role. The team began filming in early 2009, with Thiagarajan noting that apart from the plot, most features in the film would be different from the original. Prashanth put on weight for this film and the team shot in the forests of Tamil Nadu, Kerala and Karnataka. The team also filmed scenes in virgin locales across Orissa in the backdrop of waterfalls.

By April 2010, production had been ongoing for fifteen months and the film was still incomplete. The team also announced that they were planning to bring in Mallika Sherawat to play a role depicted by Silk Smitha in the original, but it did not materialise. Thiagarajan approached Thaman to compose the film's music only after completing the film's shoot and asked him to retain two songs from the original film. Prashanth and Thiagarajan then briefly postponed the film and began work on another venture, the historical Ponnar Shankar, and subsequently released that film earlier than Mambattiyan. The film finally geared up for release in December 2011, more than three years after production began, when the son of a tribal leader called Mambattiyan filed a petition preventing the release of the film. He withdrew the claims shortly after, gaining an out of court settlement. Prior to the film's release, Thiagarajan considered a possible sequel to the venture, stating he would decide after seeing the audience's response.

Release 
The film opened in December 2011 to above average reviews from film critics. Malathi Rangarajan of The Hindu claimed that "Thyagarajan has developed and executed a screenplay without gaffes, which gallops at commendable speed. Eschewing frills, he holds the viewer's attention throughout". In her review, she also added "in action, comedy, sadness and sedateness, Prashanth always makes a mark" and that "Mambattiyaan should be a milestone in Prashanth's career". The New Indian Express also gave the film a positive review, noting "For, makers while replicating the content, invariably fail to capture the soul of the original. But, Thiagarajan has managed to recapture the essence of his earlier work, even while giving the rustic saga a more contemporary feel. The screenplay is taut, the director rarely losing his grip on his narration." A reviewer from Sify.com noted the film "is a bit dated, though it moves at a rapid pace" and that it "is not engaging like the original". Another critic from Sify also noted "It is predictable, tame, outdated and slow. No single scene could be cited as well conceived or well made. Full of cliches". A critic from Behindwoods.com noted "Mambattiyan could have been so much better if the period setting was maintained in the 80s or if the characters were moulded to suit current times".

The film took a good opening at the box office, but petered out to do average business commercially and due to its big budget, failed to recover costs.

Soundtrack 

The soundtrack was composed by Thaman and was released live on Sun Music's channel on 23 November 2011. Actor Silambarasan recorded a song for the film, with the making of the song video being used for promotional purposes.

References

External links 
 

2011 films
Remakes of Indian films
2010s Tamil-language films
Films scored by Thaman S
Fictional portrayals of the Tamil Nadu Police
Indian vigilante films